Dobhi railway station (DHE) is a passenger rail station serving the village of Dobhi and nearby villages in Dobhi block of Jaunpur. This station is situated at Varanasi–Azamgarh road, where people can get easily trains for such cities. It is a very famous and small station of this area.
Track 
Double Electric-Line 
Dobhi Station four district of Central Azamgarh Varanasi Ghazipur and Jaunpur.

Outline
Dobhi railway station is one of the railway stations on the Aunrihar–Kerakat–Jaunpur line section. The station falls under the administration of Varanasi division, North Eastern Railway zone.

History
Dobhi station was established on 21 March 1904

Trains
 LOKNAYAK EXPRESS
 GONDIA–BJU EXPRESS
 GCT–ANVT SUHAILDEV EXP
 ANVT–GCT SUHAILDEV EXP
 BDTS GCT EXP
 GCT BDTS EXP
 ANVT–GCT EXP
 JNU–ARJ PASSENGER
 GCT–BSB DMU

See also
Kerakat railway station
Bengal and North Western Railway
North Eastern Railway zone
Oudh and Tirhut Railway
Sgrpg college dobhi jaunpur

References

External links
Dobhi at Indiarailinfo

Railway stations in Jaunpur district
Railway Stations in Kerakat Sub District
Railway stations opened in 1904
1904 establishments in India
Varanasi railway division